Southern California Institute of Law (SCIL) is a private California registered but unaccredited law school located in Ventura, California. The Law School was established in 1986 and operated as a fixed facility law school, accredited by the State Bar of California for twenty-five years, with campuses in both Ventura and Santa Barbara, California, until June 1, 2020.

The Law School now operates as an unaccredited, California registered, distance learning law school.

History
Southern California Institute of Law was founded in 1986. The institute was established as a fixed-facility part-time evening only law school which catered to working adults.

The school is a distance learning unaccredited law school with an evening Juris Doctor degree program.

Registered but unaccredited school
SCIL is an unaccredited law school registered with State Bar of California Committee of Bar Examiners as a distance learning unaccredited law school requiring the "study of law diligently and in good faith for at least four years" with each of the four years consisting of at "least 864 hours of preparation and study over no fewer than forty-eight and no more than fifty-two consecutive weeks...evidenced by a transcript that indicates the date each course began and ended."

SCIL is not approved by the American Bar Association. Its graduates are not automatically qualified to take the bar exam in California without meeting unaccredited school requirements and are not qualified to take a bar exam or practice law outside of California in any event.

Lawsuits

SCIL sued the State Bar of California over a requirement that California accredited law schools must maintain a 40% percent bar passage rate over a rolling five-year period, arguing that the State Bar had violated the SCIL's First Amendment rights, that the 40% benchmark was arbitrary and capricious, and that it violated the state's separation of powers. The lawsuit was dismissed by the court with prejudice. The court ruled that the State Bar had exercised its rulemaking authority under the inherent authority of the California Supreme Court over law school accreditation. The court ruled that the State Bar does not function as an executive agency of the legislature, whereby it would be subject to the substantial evidence rule of the California Administrative Procedure Act. Rather, the court held that the rational basis test applied. SCIL filed an appeal in the Ninth Circuit Court of Appeals, which affirmed the original U.S. District Court's decision. SCIL later filed an action in state court, which was dismissed on grounds of issue preclusion and was later affirmed by a state appeals court.

Tuition

The 2020 annual tuition and fees for enrollees was $3,300.

References

External links
 
 

Law schools in California
Universities and colleges in Santa Barbara County, California
Educational institutions established in 1986
Universities and colleges in Ventura County, California
1986 establishments in California
Private universities and colleges in California
Distance education institutions based in the United States